Sufficiently Breathless, the second album by Captain Beyond, was released in 1973 and features a jazzier, smoother sound than its predecessor, reminiscent of mid-1970s Santana. The medley format of the first album is retained only for the last six minutes of Sufficiently Breathless: "Voyages of Past Travellers" flows directly into "Everything's a Circle", which in turn is actually two distinct songs despite being listed under a single title. Original drummer/songwriter Bobby Caldwell had been replaced by Marty Rodriguez and Guille Garcia in the band.

According to bassist Lee Dorman, the songs were written by vocalist Rod Evans, guitarist Larry "Rhino" Reinhardt, and Dorman himself, but Rodriguez and Garcia were allotted a percentage point of the songwriting royalties due to their contributions to the arrangements. Sufficiently Breathless also featured a sixth band member, pianist Reese Wynans, but his time with Captain Beyond was brief; he did not play on the album's title track and quit after one show with the band due to his economic situation. Dorman alone was credited as writing the songs on the album, because Reinhardt and Evans were in litigation with Iron Butterfly and Deep Purple at the time.

Track listing

Personnel
 Rod Evans – lead and harmony vocals
 Larry "Rhino" Reinhardt – electric, acoustic, and slide guitars
 Lee Dorman – bass
 Reese Wynans – electric and acoustic pianos
 Marty Rodriguez – drums, backing vocals
 Guille Garcia – congas, timbales, percussion

Additional personnel
 Paul Hornsby – organ on "Starglow Energy"

References

Captain Beyond albums
Capricorn Records albums
1973 albums